Calle de República de Guatemala is a street located in the historic center of Mexico City. It is named after the country of Guatemala, a name it received in 1921.

Museo Archivo de la Fotografía is located in this street.

References

Historic center of Mexico City
Streets in Mexico City